The 1975 2. divisjon was a Norway's second-tier football league season.

The league was contested by 36 teams, divided into a total of four groups; A and B (non-Northern Norwegian teams) and two district groups which contained teams from Northern Norway: district IX–X and district XI. The winners of group A and B were promoted to the 1976 1. divisjon, while the winners of the district groups qualified for the Northern Norwegian final. The second placed teams in group A and B met the winner of the district IX–X in a qualification round where the winner was promoted to 1. divisjon. The winner of district XI was not eligible for promotion. The bottom two teams inn group A and B were relegated to the 3. divisjon. Due to restructuring of the second tier, three teams in district IX–X and 6 teams in district XI were relegated to the 1976 3. divisjon.

Bryne won group A with 32 points. HamKam won group B with 25 points. Both teams promoted to the 1976 1. divisjon. Vard finished second in group A won the qualification play-offs and was also promoted.

Tables

Group A

Group B

District IX–X

District XI

Promotion play-offs

Results
Bodø/Glimt – Vard 1–2
Vard – Odd 3–0
Odd – Bodø/Glimt 4–3

Play-off table

Northern Norwegian Final
A Northern Norwegian Final was played between the winners of the two district groups, Bodø/Glimt and Norild. 

 Norild – Bodø/Glimt 0–4

References

Norwegian First Division seasons
1975 in Norwegian football
Norway
Norway